Streptomyces humidus is a bacterium species from the genus of Streptomyces which was isolated from soil in Japan. Streptomyces humidus produces cobalamine, dihydrostreptomycin and humidin.

Further reading

See also 
 List of Streptomyces species

References

External links
Type strain of Streptomyces humidus at BacDive -  the Bacterial Diversity Metadatabase

humidus
Bacteria described in 1956